Harold Burns is a New Hampshire politician.

Harold Burns may also refer to:

Harold Burns (cricketer)

See also
Harold Birns, former Justice
Harold Byrns, conductor
Harry Burns (disambiguation)